This article is about the particular significance of the year 1778 to Wales and its people.

Incumbents
Lord Lieutenant of Anglesey - Sir Nicholas Bayly, 2nd Baronet
Lord Lieutenant of Brecknockshire and Monmouthshire – Charles Morgan of Dderw
Lord Lieutenant of Caernarvonshire - Thomas Wynn
Lord Lieutenant of Cardiganshire – Wilmot Vaughan, 1st Earl of Lisburne
Lord Lieutenant of Carmarthenshire – George Rice
Lord Lieutenant of Denbighshire - Richard Myddelton  
Lord Lieutenant of Flintshire - Sir Roger Mostyn, 5th Baronet 
Lord Lieutenant of Glamorgan – John Stuart, Lord Mountstuart
Lord Lieutenant of Merionethshire - Sir Watkin Williams-Wynn, 4th Baronet
Lord Lieutenant of Montgomeryshire – George Herbert, 2nd Earl of Powis
Lord Lieutenant of Pembrokeshire – Sir Hugh Owen, 5th Baronet
Lord Lieutenant of Radnorshire – Edward Harley, 4th Earl of Oxford and Earl Mortimer

Bishop of Bangor – John Moore
Bishop of Llandaff – Shute Barrington
Bishop of St Asaph – Jonathan Shipley
Bishop of St Davids – James Yorke

Events
9 September - Benjamin Millingchamp, is appointed chaplain on board the flagship of Admiral Sir Edward Hughes.
date unknown
A furnace is built at Sirhowy by Thomas Atkinson and William Barrow of London.  This is the first stage of the Tredegar ironworks.
Elizabeth Baker leaves her job as secretary to Hugh Vaughan at Hengwrt to live in the adjoining house of Doluwcheogryd.
Claiming himself as a prophet, watchmaker James Birch founds his own religious sect, the "Birchites", in Pembrokeshire.

Arts and literature

New books
Thomas Jones - Traethiadau ar Gatecism Eglwys Loegr: gyda phregeth ar Gonffirmasiwn (translation)
Thomas Pennant - Tour in Wales
David William - Gorfoledd ym Mhebyll Seion
Nathaniel Williams - Dialogus

Music
Blind harpist John Parry and his son David play Handel's choruses on two Welsh harps at the court of King George III of Great Britain.

Births
21 August - Lewis Weston Dillwyn, porcelain manufacturer, naturalist and politician (died 1855)
September - William Howels, preacher (died 1832)
29 September - Benjamin Hall, industrialist and politician (died 1817)
20 November - Thomas Williams (Gwilym Morgannwg), poet (died 1835)
24 November - Salusbury Pryce Humphreys, admiral (died 1845)
date unknown - David Rowlands, naval surgeon (died 1846)

Deaths
25 April - James Relly, Methodist minister, 56?
6 October - William Worthington, priest and author, 74
date unknown - William Owen, Royal Navy officer, 40/41

References

Wales
Wales